Faxinal dos Guedes is a municipality located in the state of Santa Catarina, in the Southern Region of Brazil. It is located in the Immediate Geographical Region of Xanxerê and in the Intermediate Geographical Region of Chapecó and at 307 miles away from the capital of Santa Catarina, Florianópolis. Its estimated population in 2016, according to the IBGE, was 10,649 inhabitants. It is the second municipality in highest elevation of the west of Santa Catarina being to 3297,244 ft (1005 m) of the level of the sea. 

With a high index of human development, the city is a highlight in the national scenario because it is the only one in the entire southern region of Brazil to have basic sanitation services serving 100% of the urban area besides having almost all of its asphalted streets. Is based on the paper and packaging industry and the agricultural sector, with emphasis on the production of corn and soybeans.

Etymology 
The name of Faxinal dos Guedes was born, due to the existence of the Guedes Ramos family, powerful landowners, Antonio José and Estevão Guedes Ramos, hence the name Guedes. As for Faxinal, by the characteristic of the municipality, faxinal forests identified by pastures, interspersed with slender trees.

Geography 
It is located at a latitude 26º51'10'' south and a longitude 52º15'37'' west, being at an altitude of 3297,244 ft. The area of the municipality is 273 km², with approximately 21 km in elongated form in the north-south direction, while its approximate dimension in the East-West direction is 18 km.

Climate 
The climate of the municipality of Faxinal dos Guedes is temperate. The annual average temperature is 16,4 º C, which in winter can reach temperatures below 0 º C causing snow to occur and in summer can reach temperatures up to 30 º C;

The wind in the municipality is constant due to its altitude, with the main directions being Northeast and South.

Neighboring municipalities 
{
  "type": "FeatureCollection",
  "features": [
    {
      "type": "Feature",
      "properties": {},
      "geometry": {
        "type": "Point",
        "coordinates": [
          -52.406158447266,
          -26.874305948617
        ]
      }
    },
    {
      "type": "Feature",
      "properties": {},
      "geometry": {
        "type": "Point",
        "coordinates": [
          -52.155361175537,
          -26.858380138727
        ]
      }
    },
    {
      "type": "Feature",
      "properties": {},
      "geometry": {
        "type": "Point",
        "coordinates": [
          -52.347106933594,
          -27.064629001885
        ]
      }
    },
    {
      "type": "Feature",
      "properties": {},
      "geometry": {
        "type": "Point",
        "coordinates": [
          -52.141799926758,
          -27.063406087998
        ]
      }
    },
    {
      "type": "Feature",
      "properties": {},
      "geometry": {
        "type": "Point",
        "coordinates": [
          -52.308654785156,
          -26.687956515184
        ]
      }
    },
    {
      "type": "Feature",
      "properties": {},
      "geometry": {
        "type": "Point",
        "coordinates": [
          -52.393112182617,
          -26.727826665763
        ]
      }
    },
    {
      "type": "Feature",
      "properties": {},
      "geometry": {
        "type": "Point",
        "coordinates": [
          -52.33337402343751,
          -26.551679508261213
        ]
      }
    }
  ]
}

Illustrious Citizens 
Teori Zavascki, Minister of the Brazilian Federal Supreme Court.

See also
List of municipalities in Santa Catarina

References

Municipalities in Santa Catarina (state)